The Otto Weininger Memorial Award for lifetime achievement is given annually by the Canadian Psychological Association Psychoanalytic Section to a psychoanalytic or psychodynamic psychologist who has demonstrated outstanding clinical, empirical, or theoretical contributions in the areas of psychoanalytic or psychodynamic psychology.

History of Award 
The award was first given in 2005 and named after the child psychologist Otto Weininger  (1929–2003).

Recipients of the award 
 2015 Jon Mills
 2014 Roger Frie
 2013 Josh Levy
 2012 Jonathan Shedler
 2011 Morris Eagle
 2010 Brent Willock
 2009 Polly Young-Eisendrath
 2008 Bruce Fink
 2007 Nancy McWilliams
 2006 Sidney Blatt
 2005 Peter Fonagy

See also
 List of psychology awards
 List of awards named after people

References

External links 
 http://www.cpa.ca/aboutcpa/cpasections/psychoanalyticandpsychodynamicpsychology/OttoAward
 http://www.cpa.ca/
 Caversham Booksellers list Otto Weininger

Psychology awards
Psychoanalysis
Canadian awards